Scotch Hill is an unincorporated community located  in Preston County, West Virginia, United States.

A large share of the early miners at Scotch Hill being of Scotch descent caused the name to be selected.

References 

Unincorporated communities in West Virginia
Unincorporated communities in Preston County, West Virginia